The Jonathan and Jennie Knudson House is a historic house in Brigham City, Utah. It was built in 1898-1901 by Jonathan Chester Knudson, a Mormon businessman whose father was a Danish-born convert to the Church of Jesus Christ of Latter-day Saints. Knudson lived here with his wife, née Jennie Ellen Pritchard. In the 1930s, the house was inherited by their son, Jonathan Chester Knudson, Jr., also a Mormon businessman, who lived here with his wife, Lucille. It was later deeded to their son, Jake, who lived here with his Japanese wife, Tomie Kono, a Tenrikyo minister. The house remained in the Knudson family until 1998.

The house was designed in the Victorian Eclectic style, with Queen Anne, Shingle and Neoclassical features. It has been listed on the National Register of Historic Places since December 28, 2000.

References

Houses completed in 1898
National Register of Historic Places in Box Elder County, Utah
Victorian architecture in Utah
1898 establishments in Utah